Historische Sprachforschung / Historical Linguistics is an annual peer-reviewed academic journal covering Indo-European historical linguistics. It is the second oldest linguistics journal still in publication. The current editors-in-chief are Martin Kümmel (University of Jena), Olav Hackstein, and Sabine Ziegler. The journal is published by Vandenhoeck & Ruprecht.

History 
The journal was originally established by Adalbert Kuhn in 1852, and consequently known colloquially as Kuhns Zeitschrift (Journal de Kuhn, "Kuhn's Journal"). Its official name was Zeitschrift für vergleichende Sprachforschung auf dem Gebiete des Deutschen, Griechischen und Lateinischen from 1852 to 1874. For most of this period it ran in parallel to its sister publication Beiträge zur vergleichenden Sprachforschung auf dem Gebiete der arischen, celtischen und slawischen Sprachen (known colloquially at Kuhn-Schleichlers Beiträge), which existed from 1858 to 1876.

In 1877 the publications merged with each other and with Beiträge zur Kunde der indogermanischen Sprachen (known colloquially as Bezzenbergers Beiträge, 1877-1906) as Zeitschrift für vergleichende Sprachforschung auf dem Gebiete der indo-germanischen Sprachen. This title persisted until 1967.

From 1968 to 1987 the journal was called Zeitschrift für vergleichende Sprachforschung (Journal of Comparative Linguistics).

It obtained its present title in 1988.

References

External links 
 
  Index of Kuhns Zeitschrift 1-100
Zeitschrift für vergleichende Sprachforschung, available online: 1 (1852), 1 (1852), 2 (1853), 2 (1853), 3 (1854), 3 (1854), 4 (1855), 5 (1856), 5 (1856) 6 (1857), 6 (1857), 7 (1858), 8 (1859), 8 (1859), 9 (1860), 10 (1861), 10 (1861)11 (1862), (1863), 12 (1863), 12 (1863), 13 (1864), 13 (1864), 14 (1865), 14 (1865), 14 (1865), 15 (1865), 15 (1866), 15 (1866), 16 (1867), 16 (1867), 17 (1868), 17 (1868), 18.1 (1868), 19 (1870), 20 (1872), Gesamtregister 11-20 (1874), 21(1) (1873), 22(2) (1874), 23 (1877), 27(7) (1885), 32(17) (1900), 40(20) (1907), 41 (1907), 41 (1907)

Indo-European linguistics works
Linguistics journals
Multilingual journals
Publications established in 1852
Annual journals
1852 establishments in Germany